The 2012 Kobalt Tools 400 was a NASCAR Sprint Cup Series stock car race that was held on March 11, 2012 at Las Vegas Motor Speedway in Las Vegas, Nevada. Contested over 267 laps, it was the third race of the 2012 season. The race was won by Tony Stewart for the Stewart-Haas Racing team. Jimmie Johnson finished second, and Greg Biffle clinched third.

Results

Qualifying

Race results

Standings after the race

Drivers' Championship standings

Manufacturers' Championship standings

Note: Only the top five positions are included for the driver standings.

References

NASCAR races at Las Vegas Motor Speedway
Kobalt Tools 400
Kobalt Tools 400
Kobalt Tools 400